The Singapore Cup 2009 (known as the RHB Singapore Cup due to its main sponsor) started on 27 April 2009. It was the 12th staging of the annual Singapore Cup tournament.

12 S.League clubs and 4 invited foreign teams from Thailand (2 teams), Cambodia (1) and Indonesia (1) played in this edition. The cup was a single-elimination tournament, with all sixteen teams playing from the first round. The first round involved one-off matches. Subsequent rounds involved ties of two legs.

The final was played on 8 November and won by Geylang United, who beat Bangkok Glass 1–0.

The cup winner were guaranteed a place in the 2010 AFC Cup.

Teams

  Albirex Niigata (S)
 Balestier Khalsa
  Bangkok Glass
  Brunei DPMM
 Geylang United
 Gombak United
 Home United
  Pelita Jaya
  Phnom Penh Crown
 Sengkang Punggol
 Singapore Armed Forces FC (SAFFC)
  Super Reds
 Tampines Rovers
  TTM Samut Sakhon
 Woodlands Wellington
 Young Lions (FAS under-23 team)

Knockout stage
The draw for the tournament was held on 15 April 2009

Bracket

Preliminary round

Quarter-finals

First leg

Second leg

TTM Samut Sakhon won 7 – 3 on aggregate.

Bangkok Glass won 5 – 4 on aggregate.

Geylang United won 4 – 3 on aggregate.

Albirex Niigata (S) 1 – 1 Tampines Rovers on aggregate. Albirex Niigata (S) won 3 – 1 on penalties.

Semifinals

First leg

Second leg

Geylang United 1 – 1 Albirex Niigata (S) on aggregate. Geylang United won 4-3 on penalties.

Bangkok Glass won 9 – 4 on aggregate.

Third Place Playoff

Final

See also

 Singapore Cup
 S.League
 Singapore League Cup
 Singapore Charity Shield
 Football Association of Singapore
 List of football clubs in Singapore

External links
 Official S.League website
 Football Association of Singapore website

2009
2009 domestic association football cups
Cup